was a Japanese professional baseball player. From 1953 to 1961, he played in the Pacific League as an outfielder for the Mainichi Orions (later renamed the Daimai Orions), batting .251 with 503 hits, 16 home runs and 172 RBIs.

After retiring as a player, he was a batting coach for the Yomiuri Giants and, later, a manager of the Yakult Swallows in the early 1970s.

Arakawa died on December 4, 2016, after suffering a cardiac arrest.

References

1930 births
2016 deaths
Baseball people from Tokyo
Waseda University alumni
Japanese baseball players
Daimai Orions players
Mainichi Orions players
Managers of baseball teams in Japan
Tokyo Yakult Swallows managers